Country Road or Country Roads may refer to:

Country Road (band), a country music band from Sweden
Country Road (retailer), an Australian clothing retailer
"Country Road" (song), James Taylor song
 Country Roads (TV series), a 1973 Canadian TV series

See also 
 Country Roads & Other Places, a 1969 album by Gary Burton
 "Take Me Home, Country Roads," a song by American musician John Denver